Holger Albrechtsen (23 June 1906 – 14 August 1992) was a Norwegian hurdler who specialized in the 110 and 400 metre hurdles.

He won a bronze medal in 110 metre hurdles and finished fourth in 400 metre hurdles at the 1934 European Championships. He never participated in other international events like the Summer Olympics. He became Norwegian champion in 110 metre hurdles in 1934, 1936 and 1938  and in 400 metre hurdles in 1934 and 1935. He represented IK Tjalve, having moved to Oslo from his native Arendal.

His career best time in 110 metre hurdles was 14.7 seconds, achieved in July 1933 at Bislett stadion. A year later, on the same track, he clocked a career best time in 400 metre hurdles of 54.0 seconds.

He was a board member of the Norwegian Athletics Association from 1945 through 1950, then a deputy board member from 1954 through 1955.

He died in 1992.

References 

1906 births
1992 deaths
Norwegian male hurdlers
People from Arendal
Norwegian sports executives and administrators
European Athletics Championships medalists
20th-century Norwegian people